Rubens is a ghost town in Pocahontas County, in the U.S. state of Iowa.

History
The post office in the community was variously called Powhattan, Powhatan, and Reubens before it closed in 1884. Rubens was named for Peter Paul Rubens, a Flemish painter.

References

Geography of Pocahontas County, Iowa
Ghost towns in Iowa